Doolittle may refer to:

Places
 Doolittle, Missouri, a town
 Doolittle, Texas, a census-designated place
 Doolittle (BART station), a Bay Area Rapid Transit station that will be constructed in Oakland, California
 Doolittle Massif, Churchill Mountains, Antarctica
 Doolittle Bluff, Victoria Land, Antarctica

Other uses
 Doolittle (surname)
 Doolittle (album), a 1989 album by Pixies
 Doolittles, a former Irish sandwich making company

See also
 Doolittle Raid, a World War II bombing raid on Tokyo led by Jimmy Doolittle
 Doctor Dolittle (disambiguation)
 Dolittle (programming language) 
 Dolittle (film), 2020 film